Carrie McGowan Bethel (18981974) was a Mono Lake Paiute – Kucadikadi (Northern Paiute) basketmaker associated with Yosemite National Park. She was born Carrie McGowan in Lee Vining, California, and began making baskets at age twelve. She participated in basket-making competitions in the Yosemite Indian Field Days in 1926 and 1929. She gave basket weaving demonstrations at the 1939 Golden Gate International Exposition.

Bethel was one of a group of Mono-Paiute women who "became known for their exceedingly fine, visually stunning and complex polychrome baskets." Other basket weaving artists in this group included Nellie Charlie and Lucy Telles.

Bethel died in Lee Vining, in 1974.

Legacy 

In 2006, one of her baskets sold at auction for $216,250. This basket had won first prize in the 1926 Yosemite Field Days basket competition.

Four of her baskets were part of an exhibition on the art of Yosemite which appeared at the Autry National Center, the Oakland Museum of California, the Nevada Museum of Art, and the Eiteljorg Museum of American Indians and Western Art from 2006 to 2008.

Gallery

See also
 List of Native American artists
 Visual arts by indigenous peoples of the Americas

Notes

References
 Dalrymple, Larry. Indian Basketmakers of California and the Great Basin. Santa Fe: Museum of New Mexico Press, 2000. .
 Bonhams & Butterfields, The Ella M. Cain Collection of Mono Lake Paiute Basketry. 2005. 

Native American basket weavers
Northern Paiute people
Artists from California
1898 births
1974 deaths
People from Mono County, California
20th-century American women artists
Native American women artists
Women basketweavers
20th-century Native Americans
20th-century Native American women
Native American people from California